Cider Press Review (CPR) is a literary publishing company based in San Diego, California, United States.

Cider Press Review was founded in 1999 as a journal of contemporary poetry by editors Caron Andregg and Robert Wynne. The journal of poetry is published annually in print, and four times a year electronically. The Cider Press Review Book Award is an annual literary prize issued by the journal. The winning manuscripts are published and released by Cider Press, which awards the authors a $1,500 prize.

References

External links
 Cider Press Review Homepage

Poetry magazines published in the United States
Quarterly magazines published in the United States
Magazines established in 1999
Poetry publishers
Magazines published in California
1999 establishments in California
Mass media in San Diego